Framed (Usually styled as FRAMED) is a multi-award-winning noir-puzzle game where the player re-arranges panels of an animated comic book to change the outcome of the story. Developed by the Australian studio Loveshack, Framed is an experience that sees the player changing the order of the narrative-based puzzles to a dance-meets-jazz score.

A sequel, Framed 2, was released in 2017. Framed Collection is a compilation of Framed and Framed 2 released later on in 2018 by Fellow Traveller, available on Nintendo Switch and PC.

Story 
A man is on the run from the cops, and barely makes it to an alleyway where he is discovered by the sheriff. The sheriff then tracks down his partner's train ticket and manages to follow her to the secret location, where she is exchanging secrets with the Man. He shoots the man and kills him.

The player swaps the order of the events in order to change the story.

The new outcome is that the sheriff then tracks down the man's partner's train ticket and manages to follow her to the secret location, where she is exchanging secrets, and the Man shoots the sheriff to kill him. The Man is then on the run from the cops, and barely makes it to an alleyway where he is discovered by the woman.

Gameplay 
Players take control of morally ambiguous characters as they slink their way across dark alleys and buildings in an effort to avoid the authorities and other obstacles. The goal of the game is to reorganize a series of comic panels so that the protagonist is not caught by the police. In order to accomplish this feat, players must move frames around so that the sequence allows the main character to sneak past, avoid, or knock out their would-be captors.

Reception 

As of July 2015, Framed has received over 30 awards and accolades. It has been praised by critics for its "brilliantly simple idea", "pitch perfect" execution, "subtle story telling", "gorgeous visuals", and "finger-snapping music".

In November 2014, Hideo Kojima, creator of the Metal Gear series stated that Framed was his Game of the Year. He praised Framed for its "high sense of gameplay, graphic, & sound", adding, "my best game in this year without any doubt".

References

External links 
 

2014 video games
Android (operating system) games
Games financed by Indie Fund
IOS games
Noodlecake Games games
Puzzle video games
Single-player video games
Video games about crime
Video games developed in Australia